Sterrettania is a populated place located in Erie County, Pennsylvania, United States. It is in Fairview and McKean townships, in the valley of Elk Creek, a short tributary of Lake Erie.

Sterrettania is an unincorporated community on Pennsylvania Route 832. Sterrettania is not a census designated or incorporated place having an official federally recognized name. Sterrettania appears on the Swanville U.S. Geological Survey Map, is in the Eastern Time Zone (UTC -5 hours) and observes daylight saving time.

Major intersection
West of Sterrettania, Pennsylvania Route 832 intersects with Pennsylvania Route 98.

History
The place is named for Robert Sterrett, who first settled there in 1804.  David S. Sterrett built a gristmill here in 1839, one of the largest in the county.

References

Unincorporated communities in Erie County, Pennsylvania
Unincorporated communities in Pennsylvania